Take Me to the River is a 2015 American drama film directed by Matt Sobel and starring Logan Miller, Richard Schiff, and Robin Weigert.

Premise
A naive Californian teen plans to remain above the fray at his Nebraskan family reunion, but a strange encounter places him at the center of a long buried family secret.

Cast
 Logan Miller ... Ryder 
 Robin Weigert ...Cindy             
 Josh Hamilton ...Keith 
 Richard Schiff ... Don
 Ursula Parker... Molly
 Elizabeth Franz ...Evelyn 
 Azura Skye ...Ruth 
 Ashley Gerasimovich ...Abbey 
 Grant Young ...Jeremy 
 Seth Young ...Trenton

See also
List of lesbian, gay, bisexual or transgender-related films of 2015

References

External links
 

2015 films
2015 drama films
2015 LGBT-related films
American drama films
American LGBT-related films
2010s English-language films
Films about families
Films set in Nebraska
LGBT-related drama films
2010s American films